This table shows the ranks and insignia of NCOs and Seaman in the navies of member countries of NATO. NATO maintains a "standard rank scale" in an attempt to match every member country's military rank to corresponding ranks used by the other members. The rank categories were established in the document STANAG 2116, formally titled NATO Codes for Grades of Military Personnel.

Other Ranks (OR 1–9)

See also
 NATO
 Ranks and insignia of NATO
 Ranks and insignia of NATO armies enlisted
 Ranks and insignia of NATO armies officers
 Ranks and insignia of NATO air forces enlisted
 Ranks and insignia of NATO air forces officers
 Ranks and insignia of NATO navies officers

Notes

References

External links
 History of NATO – the Atlantic Alliance - UK Government site

Military ranks of NATO